Puccinellia parishii is an uncommon species of grass known by the common names bog alkaligrass and Parish's alkali grass. It is native to the western United States, where it is known from a few locations in Arizona and New Mexico, and one occurrence each in California and Colorado.

Description
It grows in wet and seasonally wet habitat with alkali soils such as mineral springs. The inflorescence is a small array of a few narrow branches bearing spikelets.

It is an ephemeral grass, beginning to produce stems near the end of winter, flowering in early spring, dying and withering away by July.

References

External links
Jepson Manual Treatment
USDA Plants Profile
Grass Manual Treatment

parishii
Bunchgrasses of North America
Grasses of the United States
Native grasses of California
Flora of the Southwestern United States
Flora of New Mexico
Flora of the Sonoran Deserts
Flora of the California desert regions